The Synergy Aircraft Synergy is a proposed five-seat, single-engine, kit aircraft, designed by John McGinnis of Kalispell, Montana and intended for production by his company, Synergy Aircraft.

The aircraft's closed wing design, termed a "double box tail", is intended to lower induced drag and be stall resistant, along with boundary layer control methods.

Design and development
Development was started in 2010 to develop the Synergy as a future kit airplane. The Synergy is the first aircraft that was designed to use the  DeltaHawk V-4 engine. An electric-powered 1/4 scale version of the aircraft has been built and flown via radio control.

The Synergy design was unveiled at the 2011 CAFE Foundation electric aircraft symposium. The aircraft was intended to compete in the 2011 NASA/CAFE Green Flight Challenge, but its funding and engine were delayed, forcing the team to withdraw from the competition.

After receiving the DeltaHawk engine in December 2011 work resumed and a funding drive was launched to complete the prototype. Intended as a Kickstarter crowdfunding project, the initial project application and appeal were rejected on the basis of not fitting in with Kickstarter's creative arts focus. On 13 May 2012, however, Kickstarter informed McGinnis that they had reconsidered and that the project was approved. The project raised US$95,627 gross funds.>

By mid-December 2012 McGinnis indicated that the Kickstarter campaign had raised US$80,000 and that he was intending to have a flying proof-of-concept aircraft at AirVenture 2013. He also stated that if the aircraft is not complete then he will not have a display there. The Kickstarter campaign also attracted a lot of interest, but answering email and phones calls has slowed work on the prototype down.

Specifications

References

External links

Single-engined pusher aircraft
Proposed aircraft of the United States
Kickstarter projects